Second Skin was the second and final album from American rock band, the Mayfield Four. Two singles were taken from the album: "Sick and Wrong" and "Eden (Turn the Page)." Singer Myles Kennedy has stated that "Sick and Wrong" and "Flatley's Crutch" are the only songs he has written that contain profanity. Lyrically, the album features topics of love, substance abuse, violence, and sex.

Second Skin is a departure from the band's first album, Fallout, which features a more soul-influenced sound, while Second Skin moved in the band in a more hard rock direction.

Track listing 
All songs written by Myles Kennedy.
"Sick and Wrong" - 4:23
"Loose Cannon" - 3:38
"Mars Hotel" - 3:59
"Lyla" - 3:01
"Eden (Turn the Page)" - 3:56
"High" - 3:35
"Carry On" - 3:59
"Backslide" - 3:05
"White Flag" - 4:52
"Flatley's Crutch" - 3:35
"Believe" - 4:42
"Summergirl" - 4:46

References

2001 albums
The Mayfield Four albums